Delhi Public School, Kalyanpur, India, was established in 2000. It is an English medium school affiliated to the Central Board of Secondary Education, New Delhi. It's one of the schools run by the Delhi Public School Society, New Delhi.

Admissions 
Admission to Nursery is through observation/interaction with the children.

There is a written evaluation for students seeking admission to Class I to Class XI.

Academics

Curriculum 
Primary level
 Integrated and interlinked curriculum, framed on the guidelines of NCERT
 Worksheets to enhance learning skills
 	
Middle and secondary level
 NCERT prescribed curriculum
 Foreign languages are introduced
 	
Senior secondary level
 CBSE curriculum
 The student council acts a resource for the students when they need help.

Student life

Special assemblies and other programs 
 Special assemblies are organised to celebrate festivals and occasions like Labor Day and Earth Day.
 For Environment Week students were taught about ways to stop pollution.
 Assemblies are held to celebrate festivals like Diwali, Eid, Christmas, and Janmashtmi.
 A summer science camp was held in the school where Prof. H.C. Verma, a nuclear experimental physicist stationed at IIT Kanpur, spoke on the 'Saga of Physicists'.
 An activity center was dedicated to the scientists Albert Einstein, Georg Ohm, Hans Christian Ørsted, Isaac Newton, Archimedes and Michael Faraday.
 BRICS, a student body from IIT Kanpur conducted a workshop on Robotics.
 The school hosts an annual techno-cultural-sports fiesta, Panorama.
 An 'All India National Workshop on Music & Dance for Teachers was conducted by vocalist Malini Awasthi.The discussion centered around the spring season, the festival Holi and the songs associated with them, mindful of the theme Madhumaas.

Panorama 
Panorama is an annual technical-cum-cultural fest organized by DPS, Kalyanpur. It was organised for the first time in 2008, by the batch of Class XII, and 35 schools participated. There were technical competitions, ranging from coding competitions to DJ mixing, and cultural events like poster making and dance competitions. Sports competitions were organized including short sprint races and football and cricket matches. Music was played and food available.
It is organized by the senior students (class XI and XII) with little help from the teachers in matters of supervision, permissions, etc.  All sponsorship, event planning and execution are taken over by the students.

Infrastructure

Sports 
Lawn tennis court
Football field
Volleyball court
Badminton court
Chess/carrom room
Table tennis room
200 metre athletic track
Handball court
Basketball court
Hockey field
Squash courts
Gymnasium
Swimming pool

Academic infrastructure 
Social Science lab
Computer labs
Fine Arts lab
English Language Lab
Mathematics Lab
Dance and Music Room
Physics Lab
Biology Lab
Chemistry Lab
Animation Lab
Library

Other buildings/facilities 
The school has its own auditorium, Rivera, with a capacity of over 2000 people. The auditorium is used for assemblies and cultural shows and fests. Inside the auditorium are three badminton courts and one basketball court. The school has a canteen where snacks are sold, and an infirmary where a qualified nurse looks after the well being of students.

Achievements 
 A student of the school took part in a music bonanza organised by a private radio channel. Among 15,000 participants, the student was analysed by a panel of highly acclaimed judges before he was placed in the top three.
 Students of classes 10th and 12th have performed well in their board exams and have topped in the city as well as in the country.

See also 
 List of schools in Kanpur
 Delhi Public School Society

References 

Delhi Public School Society
Primary schools in Uttar Pradesh
High schools and secondary schools in Uttar Pradesh
Schools in Kanpur
Educational institutions established in 2000
2000 establishments in Uttar Pradesh